Roald Edwin van der Linde  (born 22 November 1968 in Rotterdam) is a Dutch politician. As a member of the People's Party for Freedom and Democracy (Volkspartij voor Vrijheid en Democratie) he has been an MP since 7 September 2017. He previously served between 8 November 2012 and 23 March 2017. He returned to the House after the resignation of Pieter Duisenberg.

References 

1968 births
Living people
Members of the House of Representatives (Netherlands)
Politicians from Rotterdam
People's Party for Freedom and Democracy politicians
21st-century Dutch politicians